Thermal radiation is electromagnetic radiation generated by the thermal motion of particles in matter. Thermal radiation is generated when heat from the movement of charges in the material (electrons and protons in common forms of matter) is converted to electromagnetic radiation. All matter with a temperature greater than absolute zero emits thermal radiation. At room temperature, most of the emission is in the infrared (IR) spectrum. Particle motion results in charge-acceleration or dipole oscillation which produces electromagnetic radiation.

Infrared radiation emitted by animals (detectable with an infrared camera) and cosmic microwave background radiation are examples of thermal radiation.

If a radiation object meets the physical characteristics of a black body in thermodynamic equilibrium, the radiation is called blackbody radiation. Planck's law describes the spectrum of blackbody radiation, which depends solely on the object's temperature. Wien's displacement law determines the most likely frequency of the emitted radiation, and the Stefan–Boltzmann law gives the radiant intensity.

Thermal radiation is also one of the fundamental mechanisms of heat transfer.

Overview
Thermal radiation is the emission of electromagnetic waves from all matter that has a temperature greater than absolute zero. Thermal radiation reflects the conversion of thermal energy into electromagnetic energy. Thermal energy is the kinetic energy of random movements of atoms and molecules in matter. All matter with a nonzero temperature is composed of particles with kinetic energy. These atoms and molecules are composed of charged particles, i.e., protons and electrons. The kinetic interactions among matter particles result in charge acceleration and dipole oscillation. This results in the electrodynamic generation of coupled electric and magnetic fields, resulting in the emission of photons, radiating energy away from the body. Electromagnetic radiation, including visible light, will propagate indefinitely in vacuum.

The characteristics of thermal radiation depend on various properties of the surface from which it is emanating, including its temperature, its spectral emissivity, as expressed by Kirchhoff's law. The radiation is not monochromatic, i.e., it does not consist of only a single frequency, but comprises a continuous spectrum of photon energies, its characteristic spectrum. If the radiating body and its surface are in thermodynamic equilibrium and the surface has perfect absorptivity at all wavelengths, it is characterized as a black body. A black body is also a perfect emitter. The radiation of such perfect emitters is called black-body radiation. The ratio of any body's emission relative to that of a black body is the body's emissivity, so that a black body has an emissivity of unity (i.e., one).

Absorptivity, reflectivity, and emissivity of all bodies are dependent on the wavelength of the radiation. Due to reciprocity, absorptivity and emissivity for any particular wavelength are equal at equilibrium – a good absorber is necessarily a good emitter, and a poor absorber is a poor emitter. The temperature determines the wavelength distribution of the electromagnetic radiation. For example, the white paint in the diagram to the right is highly reflective to visible light (reflectivity about 0.80), and so appears white to the human eye due to reflecting sunlight, which has a peak wavelength of about 0.5 micrometers. Thus, to thermal radiation it appears black.

The distribution of power that a black body emits with varying frequency is described by Planck's law. At any given temperature, there is a frequency fmax at which the power emitted is a maximum. Wien's displacement law, and the fact that the frequency is inversely proportional to the wavelength, indicates that the peak frequency fmax is proportional to the absolute temperature T of the black body. The photosphere of the sun, at a temperature of approximately 6000 K, emits radiation principally in the (human-)visible portion of the electromagnetic spectrum. Earth's atmosphere is partly transparent to visible light, and the light reaching the surface is absorbed or reflected. Earth's surface emits the absorbed radiation, approximating the behavior of a black body at 300 K with spectral peak at fmax. At these lower frequencies, the atmosphere is largely opaque and radiation from Earth's surface is absorbed or scattered by the atmosphere. Though about 10% of this radiation escapes into space, most is absorbed and then re-emitted by atmospheric gases. It is this spectral selectivity of the atmosphere that is responsible for the planetary greenhouse effect, contributing to global warming and climate change in general (but also critically contributing to climate stability when the composition and properties of the atmosphere are not changing).

The incandescent light bulb has a spectrum overlapping the black body spectra of the sun and the earth. Some of the photons emitted by a tungsten light bulb filament at 3000 K are in the visible spectrum. Most of the energy is associated with photons of longer wavelengths; these do not help a person see, but still transfer heat to the environment, as can be deduced empirically by observing an incandescent light bulb. Whenever EM radiation is emitted and then absorbed, heat is transferred. This principle is used in microwave ovens, laser cutting, and RF hair removal.

Unlike conductive and convective forms of heat transfer, thermal radiation can be concentrated in a tiny spot by using reflecting mirrors, which concentrating solar power takes advantage of. Instead of mirrors, Fresnel lenses can also be used to concentrate radiant energy. (In principle, any kind of lens can be used, but only the Fresnel lens design is practical for very large lenses.) Either method can be used to quickly vaporize water into steam using sunlight.

Surface effects
Lighter colors and also whites and metallic substances absorb less of the illuminating light, and as a result heat up less; but otherwise color makes little difference as regards heat transfer between an object at everyday temperatures and its surroundings, since the dominant emitted wavelengths are nowhere near the visible spectrum, but rather in the far infrared. Emissivities at those wavelengths are largely unrelated to visual emissivities (visible colors); in the far infra-red, most objects have high emissivities. Thus, except in sunlight, the color of clothing makes little difference as regards warmth; likewise, paint color of houses makes little difference to warmth except when the painted part is sunlit.

The main exception to this is shiny metal surfaces, which have low emissivities both in the visible wavelengths and in the far infrared. Such surfaces can be used to reduce heat transfer in both directions; an example of this is the multi-layer insulation used to insulate spacecraft.

Low-emissivity windows in houses are a more complicated technology, since they must have low emissivity at thermal wavelengths while remaining transparent to visible light.

Nanostructures with spectrally selective thermal emittance properties offer numerous technological applications for energy generation and efficiency, e.g., for daytime radiative cooling of photovoltaic cells and buildings. These applications require high emittance in the frequency range corresponding to the atmospheric transparency window in 8 to 13 micron wavelength range. A selective emitter radiating strongly in this range is thus exposed to the clear sky, enabling the use of the outer space as a very low temperature heat sink.

Personalized cooling technology is another example of an application where optical spectral selectivity can be beneficial. Conventional personal cooling is typically achieved through heat conduction and convection. However, the human body is a very efficient emitter of infrared radiation, which provides an additional cooling mechanism. Most conventional fabrics are opaque to infrared radiation and block thermal emission from the body to the environment. Fabrics for personalized cooling applications have been proposed that enable infrared transmission to directly pass through clothing, while being opaque at visible wavelengths, allowing the wearer to remain cooler.

Properties
There are four main properties that characterize thermal radiation (in the limit of the far field):
Thermal radiation emitted by a body at any temperature consists of a wide range of frequencies. The frequency distribution is given by Planck's law of black-body radiation for an idealized emitter as shown in the diagram at top.
The dominant frequency (or color) range of the emitted radiation shifts to higher frequencies as the temperature of the emitter increases. For example, a red hot object radiates mainly in the long wavelengths (red and orange) of the visible band. If it is heated further, it also begins to emit discernible amounts of green and blue light, and the spread of frequencies in the entire visible range cause it to appear white to the human eye; it is white hot. Even at a white-hot temperature of 2000 K, 99% of the energy of the radiation is still in the infrared. This is determined by Wien's displacement law. In the diagram the peak value for each curve moves to the left as the temperature increases.
The total amount of radiation of all frequency increases steeply as the temperature rises; it grows as T4, where T is the absolute temperature of the body. An object at the temperature of a kitchen oven, about twice the room temperature on the absolute temperature scale (600 K vs. 300 K) radiates 16 times as much power per unit area. An object at the temperature of the filament in an incandescent light bulb—roughly 3000 K, or 10 times room temperature—radiates 10,000 times as much energy per unit area. The total radiative intensity of a black body rises as the fourth power of the absolute temperature, as expressed by the Stefan–Boltzmann law. In the plot, the area under each curve grows rapidly as the temperature increases.
The rate of electromagnetic radiation emitted at a given frequency is proportional to the amount of absorption that it would experience by the source, a property known as reciprocity. Thus, a surface that absorbs more red light thermally radiates more red light. This principle applies to all properties of the wave, including wavelength (color), direction, polarization, and even coherence, so that it is quite possible to have thermal radiation which is polarized, coherent, and directional, though polarized and coherent forms are fairly rare in nature far from sources (in terms of wavelength). See section below for more on this qualification.

As for photon statistics thermal light obeys Super-Poissonian statistics.

Near-field and far-field
The general properties of thermal radiation as described by Planck's law apply if the linear dimension of all parts considered, as well as radii of curvature of all surfaces are large compared with the wavelength of the ray considered' (typically from 8-25 micrometres for the emitter at 300 K). Indeed, thermal radiation as discussed above takes only radiating waves (far-field, or electromagnetic radiation) into account. A more sophisticated framework involving electromagnetic theory must be used for smaller distances from the thermal source or surface (near-field radiative heat transfer). For example, although far-field thermal radiation at distances from surfaces of more than one wavelength is generally not coherent to any extent, near-field thermal radiation (i.e., radiation at distances of a fraction of various radiation wavelengths) may exhibit a degree of both temporal and spatial coherence.

Planck's law of thermal radiation has been challenged in recent decades by predictions and successful demonstrations of the radiative heat transfer between objects separated by nanoscale gaps that deviate significantly from the law predictions. This deviation is especially strong (up to several orders in magnitude) when the emitter and absorber support surface polariton modes that can couple through the gap separating cold and hot objects. However, to take advantage of the surface-polariton-mediated near-field radiative heat transfer, the two objects need to be separated by ultra-narrow gaps on the order of microns or even nanometers. This limitation significantly complicates practical device designs.

Another way to modify the object thermal emission spectrum is by reducing the dimensionality of the emitter itself. This approach builds upon the concept of confining electrons in quantum wells, wires and dots, and tailors thermal emission by engineering confined photon states in two- and three-dimensional potential traps, including wells, wires, and dots. Such spatial confinement concentrates photon states and enhances thermal emission at select frequencies. To achieve the required level of photon confinement, the dimensions of the radiating objects should be on the order of or below the thermal wavelength predicted by Planck's law. Most importantly, the emission spectrum of thermal wells, wires and dots deviates from Planck's law predictions not only in the near field, but also in the far field, which significantly expands the range of their applications.

Subjective color to the eye of a black body thermal radiator

Selected radiant heat fluxes
The time to a damage from exposure to radiative heat is a function of the rate of delivery of the heat. Radiative heat flux and effects: 
(1 W/cm2 = 10 kW/m2)

Interchange of energy

Thermal radiation is one of the three principal mechanisms of heat transfer. It entails the emission of a spectrum of electromagnetic radiation due to an object's temperature. Other mechanisms are convection and conduction. 

Radiation heat transfer is characteristically different from the other two in that it does not require a medium and, in fact it reaches maximum efficiency in a vacuum.  Electromagnetic radiation has some proper characteristics depending on the frequency and wavelengths of the radiation. The phenomenon of radiation is not yet fully understood. Two theories have been used to explain radiation; however neither of them is perfectly satisfactory.

First, the earlier theory which originated from the concept of a hypothetical medium referred as ether. Ether supposedly fills all evacuated or non-evacuated spaces.  The transmission of light or of radiant heat are allowed by the propagation of electromagnetic waves in the ether. television and radio broadcasting waves are types of electromagnetic waves with specific wavelengths. All electromagnetic waves travel at the same speed; therefore, shorter wavelengths are associated with high frequencies. Since every body or fluid is submerged in the ether, due to the vibration of the molecules, any body or fluid can potentially initiate an electromagnetic wave.  All bodies generate and receive electromagnetic waves at the expense of its stored energy 

The second theory of radiation is best known as the quantum theory and was first offered by Max Planck in 1900. According to this theory, energy emitted by a radiator is not continuous but is in the form of quanta. Planck claimed that quantities had different sizes and frequencies of vibration similarly to the wave theory. The energy E is found by the expression E = hν, where h is the Planck constant and ν is the frequency. Higher frequencies are originated by high temperatures and create an increase of energy in the quantum. While the propagation of electromagnetic waves of all wavelengths is often referred as "radiation", thermal radiation is often constrained to the visible and infrared regions. For engineering purposes, it may be stated that thermal radiation is a form of electromagnetic radiation which varies on the nature of a surface and its temperature. Radiation waves may travel in unusual patterns compared to conduction heat flow. Radiation allows waves to travel from a heated body through a cold nonabsorbing or partially absorbing medium and reach a warmer body again. This is the case of the radiation waves that travel from the sun to the earth.

The interplay of energy exchange by thermal radiation is characterized by the following equation:

Here,  represents the spectral absorption component,  spectral reflection component and  the spectral transmission component. These elements are a function of the wavelength of the electromagnetic radiation. The spectral absorption is equal to the emissivity ; this relation is known as Kirchhoff's law of thermal radiation. An object is called a black body if this holds for all frequencies, and the following formula applies:

Reflectivity deviates from the other properties in that it is bidirectional in nature. In other words, this property depends on the direction of the incident of radiation as well as the direction of the reflection. Therefore, the reflected rays of a radiation spectrum incident on a real surface in a specified direction forms an irregular shape that is not easily predictable.  In practice, surfaces are often assumed to reflect either in a perfectly specular or a diffuse manner.  In a specular reflection, the angles of reflection and incidence are equal. In diffuse reflection, radiation is reflected equally in all directions. Reflection from smooth and polished surfaces can be assumed to be specular reflection, whereas reflection from rough surfaces approximates diffuse reflection. In radiation analysis a surface is defined as smooth if the height of the surface roughness is much smaller relative to the wavelength of the incident radiation.

In a practical situation and room-temperature setting, humans lose considerable energy due to thermal radiation in infra-red in addition to that lost by conduction to air (aided by concurrent convection, or other air movement like drafts). The heat energy lost is partially regained by absorbing heat radiation from walls or other surroundings. (Heat gained by conduction would occur for air temperature higher than body temperature.) Otherwise, body temperature is maintained from generated heat through internal metabolism. Human skin has an emissivity of very close to 1.0. If people are indoors, surrounded by surfaces at 296 K, they receive back about 900 watts from the wall, ceiling, and other surroundings, so the net loss is only about 100 watts. These heat transfer estimates are highly dependent on extrinsic variables, such as wearing clothes, i.e. decreasing total thermal circuit conductivity, therefore reducing total output heat flux. Only truly gray systems (relative equivalent emissivity/absorptivity and no directional transmissivity dependence in all control volume bodies considered) can achieve reasonable steady-state heat flux estimates through the Stefan-Boltzmann law. Encountering this "ideally calculable" situation is almost impossible (although common engineering procedures surrender the dependency of these unknown variables and "assume" this to be the case). Optimistically, these "gray" approximations will get close to real solutions, as most divergence from Stefan-Boltzmann solutions is very small (especially in most STP lab controlled environments).

If objects appear white (reflective in the visual spectrum), they are not necessarily equally reflective (and thus non-emissive) in the thermal infrared – see the diagram at the left. Most household radiators are painted white, which is sensible given that they are not hot enough to radiate any significant amount of heat, and are not designed as thermal radiators at all – instead, they are actually convectors, and painting them matt black would make little difference to their efficacy. Acrylic and urethane based white paints have 93% blackbody radiation efficiency at room temperature (meaning the term "black body" does not always correspond to the visually perceived color of an object). These materials that do not follow the "black color = high emissivity/absorptivity" caveat will most likely have functional spectral emissivity/absorptivity dependence.

Calculation of radiative heat transfer between groups of object, including a 'cavity' or 'surroundings' requires solution of a set of simultaneous equations using the radiosity method. In these calculations, the geometrical configuration of the problem is distilled to a set of numbers called view factors, which give the proportion of radiation leaving any given surface that hits another specific surface. These calculations are important in the fields of solar thermal energy, boiler and furnace design and raytraced computer graphics.

A selective surface can be used when energy is being extracted from the sun. Selective surfaces can also be used on solar collectors. We can find out how much help a selective surface coating is by looking at the equilibrium temperature of a plate that is being heated through solar radiation. If the plate is receiving a solar irradiation of 1350 W/m2 (minimum is 1325 W/m2 on 4 July and maximum is 1418 W/m2 on 3 January) from the sun the temperature of the plate where the radiation leaving is equal to the radiation being received by the plate is 393 K (248 °F). If the plate has a selective surface with an emissivity of 0.9 and a cut off wavelength of 2.0 μm, the equilibrium temperature is approximately 1250 K (1790 °F). The calculations were made neglecting convective heat transfer and neglecting the solar irradiation absorbed in the clouds/atmosphere for simplicity, the theory is still the same for an actual problem.

To reduce the heat transfer from a surface, such as a glass window, a clear reflective film with a low emissivity coating can be placed on the interior of the surface. "Low-emittance (low-E) coatings are microscopically thin, virtually invisible, metal or metallic oxide layers deposited on a window or skylight glazing surface primarily to reduce the U-factor by suppressing radiative heat flow". By adding this coating we are limiting the amount of radiation that leaves the window thus increasing the amount of heat that is retained inside the window.

Since any electromagnetic radiation, including thermal radiation, conveys momentum as well as energy, thermal radiation also induces very small forces on the radiating or absorbing objects. Normally these forces are negligible, but they must be taken into account when considering spacecraft navigation. The Pioneer anomaly, where the motion of the craft slightly deviated from that expected from gravity alone, was eventually tracked down to asymmetric thermal radiation from the spacecraft.  Similarly, the orbits of asteroids are perturbed since the asteroid absorbs solar radiation on the side facing the sun, but then re-emits the energy at a different angle as the rotation of the asteroid carries the warm surface out of the sun's view (the YORP effect).

Radiative power

Thermal radiation power of a black body in the orthogonal direction per unit area of radiating surface per unit of solid angle and per unit frequency  is given by Planck's law as:

or instead of per unit frequency, per unit wavelength as

This formula mathematically follows from calculation of spectral distribution of energy in quantized electromagnetic field which is in complete thermal equilibrium with the radiating object.  Plancks law shows that radiative energy increases with temperature, and explains why the peak of an emission spectrum shifts to shorter wavelengths at higher temperatures. It can also be found that energy emitted at shorter wavelengths increases more rapidly with temperature relative to longer wavelengths. The equation is derived as an infinite sum over all possible frequencies in a semi-sphere region. The energy, of each photon is multiplied by the number of states available at that frequency, and the probability that each of those states will be occupied.

Integrating the above equation over  the power output given by the Stefan–Boltzmann law is obtained, as:

The wavelength , for which the emission intensity is highest, is given by Wien's displacement law as:

For surfaces which are not black bodies, one has to consider the (generally frequency dependent) emissivity factor . This factor has to be multiplied with the radiation spectrum formula before integration. If it is taken as a constant, the resulting formula for the power output can be written in a way that contains  as a factor:

This type of theoretical model, with frequency-independent emissivity lower than that of a perfect black body, is often known as a grey body. For frequency-dependent emissivity, the solution for the integrated power depends on the functional form of the dependence, though in general there is no simple expression for it. Practically speaking, if the emissivity of the body is roughly constant around the peak emission wavelength, the gray body model tends to work fairly well since the weight of the curve around the peak emission tends to dominate the integral.

Constants
Definitions of constants used in the above equations:

Variables
Definitions of variables, with example values:

Radiative heat transfer
The net radiative heat transfer from one surface to another is the radiation leaving the first surface for the other minus that arriving from the second surface.

Formulas for radiative heat transfer can be derived for more particular or more elaborate physical arrangements, such as between parallel plates, concentric spheres and the internal surfaces of a cylinder.

See also

Incandescence
Infrared photography
Interior radiation control coating
Heat transfer
Planck radiation
Radiant cooling
Sakuma–Hattori equation
Thermal dose unit
View factor

References

Further reading

E.M. Sparrow and R.D. Cess. Radiation Heat Transfer. Hemisphere Publishing Corporation, 1978.

Thermal Infrared Remote Sensing:
Kuenzer, C. and S. Dech (2013): Thermal Infrared Remote Sensing: Sensors, Methods, Applications (= Remote Sensing and Digital Image Processing 17). Dordrecht: Springer.

External links
 Black Body Emission Calculator
 Heat transfer
 Atmospheric Radiation
 Infrared Temperature Calibration 101

Electromagnetic radiation
Heat transfer
Thermodynamics